The Rekolokomotives of DR Class 52.80 first appeared in 1960 in service with the Deutsche Reichsbahn in East Germany as extensive rebuilds of the wartime locomotives or Kriegslokomotiven of the DRB Class 52 built by Nazi Germany. This modernisation, described as 'reconstruction' (Rekonstruktion, hence Rekolokomotive), extended to almost all of the components and systems on the engine.

Overview
This reconstruction should not to be confused with the general repair of a number of locomotives which was also carried out in the Stendal Reichsbahn repair shop (Reichsbahnausbesserungswerk or RAW) from 1959 onwards. Under that programme only the refinements omitted during wartime were added back, and worn out components - or those which were too small (again for wartime austerity reasons) - were replaced. Usually only the firebox and pony trucks were replaced. These refurbished engines retained their original numbers, however the Rekoloks were reorganised, irrespective of their original numbers, into sub-class 52.80.

For economic reasons the general repair programme was cut back, nevertheless in early summer 1960 work began on the reconstruction of Class 52 at RAW Stendal. Up to 1967, 200 locomotives were rebuilt with a slightly modified, Typ 50E, combustion-chambered boiler, originally designed for the Class 50.35. Other notable features of the Rekolok were new, welded cylinders, an IfS/DR mixer-preheater system and a new driver's cab front walls with oval windows, mainly on account of the new boiler. The intention to replace the entire the cab and provide the engines with new tenders did not come about. The worn out Class 2'2'T30 tub tenders were mainly given new tubs.

Other reconstruction measures included the installation of axle box tightening wedges and the replacement of the Krauss-Helmholtz bogies. Despite often expressed views to the contrary, the valves were not replaced or rebuilt as part of the reconstruction. The 52.80 had standard piston valves with Winterthur pressure equalisation and hence poor riding qualities when running light. Not until the 1980s were Trofimoff valves and cylinder safety valves installed on some locomotives at RAW Meiningen. This improved the riding performance hugely when the engines ran without a train, something which was also noticeable in terms of savings in lubricants and fuel.

Some locomotives were also fitted with Giesl-Gieslingen suction draught systems, the so-called Giesl ejectors. However, for licensing reasons, these were removed once they had worn out or become defective.

Surviving locomotives
Of the originally 200 locomotives reconstructed, a large number are still in existence in the hands of various owners in varying condition (see List of preserved steam locomotives in Germany). At present (August 2007) ten working examples are known of.  Number 52 8055 was extensively rebuilt, using advanced steam technology, oil firing and roller bearings for both axles and drive by the Swiss company Dampflokomotiv- und Maschinenfabrik DLM AG in 1998. Since 2003 it is owned by its rebuilder DLM AG and based in Schaffhausen, Switzerland. Being equipped with automatic trainstop of both Signum and ETCS-LS type it is fully certified for operation on the Swiss standard gauge network. Number 52 8055 also have a South African Railways 5 chime steam whistle & a 3 chime whistle that was usually used on The LNER Class A4s.

Gallery

See also 
 Deutsche Reichsbahn (East Germany)
 List of East German Deutsche Reichsbahn locomotives and railbuses
 DRB Class 52
 Rekolok
 List of preserved steam locomotives in Germany

References

External links 

 Photos, data and information about DR Class 52.80s (German) 

52.80
2-10-0 locomotives
52.80
Railway locomotives introduced in 1960
Standard gauge locomotives of Germany
1′E h2 locomotives
Rebuilt locomotives 
Freight locomotives